C. mexicana  may refer to:
 Ceratozamia mexicana, a plant species endemic to Mexico
 Copelandia mexicana, a mushroom species in the genus Copelandia
 Crataegus mexicana, the tejocote, manzanita, tejocotera or Mexican hawthorn, a tree species native to the mountains of Mexico and parts of Guatemala

Synonyms
 Cowania mexicana, a synonym for Purshia mexicana, the Mexican cliffrose, a perennial flowering small tree species native to Mexico and the southwestern United States

See also
 Mexicana (disambiguation)